Frisvold is a surname. Notable people with the surname include:

Erland Frisvold (1877–1971), Norwegian colonel, civil engineer and politician
Paal Frisvold (born 1908) (1908–1997), Norwegian general
Paal Frisvold (born 1962), Norwegian organizational leader and fencer
Sigurd Frisvold (born 1947), Norwegian general